The Port Phillip District was an administrative division of the Colony of New South Wales from 9 September 1836 until 1 July 1851, when it was separated from New South Wales and became the Colony of Victoria.

In September 1836, NSW Colonial Secretary Alexander Macleay declared Captain William Lonsdale the "Police Magistrate" of "the location of Settlers on the vacant Crown Lands adjacent to the shores of Port Phillip." This position was someone "of which all persons concerned are hereby required to take notice."

In May 1839, Governor George Gipps defined the "Port Phillip District" as "The whole of the Lands comprised in the District lying to the south of the main range, between the Rivers Ovens and Goulburn, and adjacent to Port Phillip." In July that year, Colonial Secretary E Deas Thomson announced that Charles La Trobe was the District's "Superintendent", (which was later said by Governor Gipps "to have the powers of a Lieutenant Governor").

On September 10, the District was announced in a government notice to be "all that part of the Territory of New South Wales which is bounded on the north by the thirty-sixth degree of south latitude; on the east by the one hundred and forty-sixth degree of east longitude, measuring from the meridian of Greenwich; on the south by the waters of Bass's Straits and the Pacific Ocean, and on the west by the one hundred and forty-first degree of east longitude, from the said meridian of Greenwich." (141°E was the border with South Australia.)  

In December 1840, for the purposes of government land sales, the northern border of the "Southern or Port Phillip District" was defined to follow the course of the Murray and Murrumbidgee Rivers, and from its source to the mouth of the Moruya River. This coincided with the introduction of a fixed-price land sale scheme. This did not change the boundaries of La Trobe's jurisdiction, though all the Crown Land sold at that time was within that smaller area. 

After extensive opposition in Sydney, including from the Legislative Council, thoughts about the bounds of the district that should be administered from Melbourne were retracted south to follow the Murray River alone. 

On 30 July 1842, "An Act for the Government of New South Wales and Van Diemen's Land" was passed, which defined electorates within those colonies. It included "that for the purposes of this Act the boundary of the District of Port Phillip on the North and North-east shall be a straight line drawn from Cape Howe to the nearest source of the River Murray, and thence the course of that River to the Eastern boundary of the Province of South Australia." In January 1843, it was announced that the Town of Melbourne would have 1 representative in the soon-to-be formed NSW Parliament, while the remainder of the District of Port Phillip would have 5. The polling places were to be in Melbourne, Geelong and Portland.

On 28 February 1843, Governor Gipps proclaimed that the "Southern or Port Phillip District" for land disposal would now be defined as being the Counties of Bourke (Melbourne), Grant (Geelong) and Normanby (Portland). These were the places within La Trobe's territory adjacent to the existing European settlement, and the location of any Crown Land to be sold.

On 1 July 1843, Governor Gipps proclaimed that La Trobe's jurisdiction was now the same as the newly formed electorate.

On 1 July 1851, the District was separated from New South Wales under provisions of the Australian Colonies Government Act 1850, and became the Colony of Victoria. This day would be celebrated for many years as "Separation Day."

References

Further reading
 

History of Victoria (Australia)
1836 establishments in Australia